The Spirit of '76 (real name William Naslund) is a superhero appearing in American comic books published by Marvel Comics. Created by writer Roy Thomas and artist Frank Robbins as part of a World War II-era superhero team, the Crusaders, and patterned on the DC Comics group the Freedom Fighters, the character first appeared in The Invaders #14 (March 1977). 

The Spirit of '76 was the equivalent of Freedom Fighters member Uncle Sam, originally a Quality Comics character. In the stories, the character briefly assumed the role of Captain America after the original – Steve Rogers – was presumed dead. However, he was killed in action.

Publication history
Marvel's Spirit of '76 appeared as a member of the short-lived superhero team the Crusaders in The Invaders #14–15 (March–April 1977). In a canonical portion of a story in issue #4 (Aug. 1977) of the alternative universe series What If?, Naslund succeeds Steve Rogers as Captain America, the first of three official replacements until Rogers resumed the role years later. This retcon became necessary after Marvel's conflicting accounts of Captain America in 1950s and 1960s comics had created a discrepancy.

Fictional character biography
William Naslund was born in Philadelphia, Pennsylvania. An athletic young man, hoping to help the Allies' World War II efforts in a unique way, he develops exceptional fighting skills and learns to copy some of the moves Captain America employed with the discus-like shield that he carried. He is recruited by a mysterious man called "Alfie" to become a costumed hero in the new team of adventurers called the Crusaders, alongside Dyna-Mite, Ghost Girl, Thunderfist, Captain Wings, and Tommy Lightning. The team eventually learns that Alfie is a German agent, but not before he has manipulated them into fighting the Allied super-team the Invaders. Upon learning how they had been duped, all the Crusaders but Naslund left costumed adventuring.

When the original Captain America, Steve Rogers, and his sidekick, Bucky, went missing in action in 1945, U.S. President Harry S. Truman recruited Naslund and a young man named Fred Davis to become the new Captain America and Bucky. Alongside Namor the Sub-Mariner and the original Red Guardian, the new Captain America stopped a Nazi plot to destroy the Potsdam Conference. They briefly fought alongside the post-war All-Winners Squad, battling Isbisa and, with the Blonde Phantom, fought to prevent a criminal attempt to steal the atomic bomb, encountering a time-traveling She-Hulk during this mission. Naslund was killed in 1946 in the line of duty when he was crushed to death by a robot serving the android named Adam II while warning the rest of the All-Winners Squad of Adam II's attempt to kidnap or kill then-Congressional candidate John F. Kennedy in Boston. Naslund was succeeded as Captain America by Jeffrey Mace, formerly the superhero Patriot. Naslund was later brought through time by the Contemplator to battle an Adam II of an alternate world alongside the original Captain America, Jeffrey Mace, and the 1950s Captain America.

Powers and abilities
William Naslund had no superhuman powers but was a brilliant athlete and a superb hand-to-hand combatant. As the Spirit of '76, he designed and wore a cloak made of an unknown bulletproof and fireproof material. As Captain America, he carried a steel shield, approximately 2.5 feet in diameter and fashioned by the U.S. government after the design used by the original Captain America.

References

External links
Marvel.com: Spirit of '76
Marvel.com: All-Winners Squad
Grand Comics Database: The Invaders #14

Captain America characters
Characters created by Frank Robbins
Characters created by Roy Thomas
Comics characters introduced in 1977
Fictional characters from Philadelphia
Fictional shield fighters
Fictional World War II veterans
Incarnations of Captain America
Marvel Comics military personnel
Marvel Comics superheroes
United States-themed superheroes